The Labour Relations Agency (LRA) is a Non-Departmental Public Body in Northern Ireland responsible for promoting the improvement of industrial relations. Founded in 1976, the Agency is independent of Government and funded by a grant from the Department for the Economy.

The LRA provides impartial and confidential employment relations advice to employers, employees and trade unions. The Agency also resolves disputes through conciliation, mediation and arbitration services.

The management of the Labour Relations Agency is vested in the LRA Board. The Chairperson until 2014 was Jim McCusker, former General Secretary of the public sector trade union NIPSA. The rest of the board is made up of experienced trade unionists and industry and employment law specialists.

References

Northern Ireland Executive
Labor relations boards
Labour relations in the United Kingdom